The phrase Royal Melbourne can be used in several contexts:

The following organisations, institutions, and places in Melbourne, Australia, were named after William Lamb, 2nd Viscount Melbourne:
Royal Melbourne Golf Club
Royal Botanic Gardens, Melbourne
Royal Melbourne Hospital
Royal Melbourne Yacht Squadron
Royal Melbourne Philharmonic

The following is an area in Chicago, U.S.A.
Royal Melbourne (Chicago)

See also

Melbourne (disambiguation)